Neotelphusa huemeri is a moth of the family Gelechiidae. It is found in Portugal, Spain, southern France and on Corsica and Sardinia.

The larvae feed on Cistus salvifolius, Cistus laurifolius, Cistus monspeliensis and Cistus psilosepalus.

References

Moths described in 1998
Neotelphusa